Penske Media Corporation (PMC) is an American digital media, publishing, and information services company based in Los Angeles and New York City. It publishes more than 20 digital and print brands, including Variety, Rolling Stone, WWD, Deadline Hollywood, Billboard, Boy Genius Report, Robb Report, Artforum, ARTNews, and others. PMC's Chairman and CEO since founding is Jay Penske.

History

Founding and early years of Penske Media

Penske Media Corporation was founded by Jay Penske in 2003. It began as an affinity marketing and internet services company called Velocity Services, Inc. The company acquired the Mail.com domain and was renamed to the Mail.com Media Corporation (MMC). By 2008, the company owned digital entertainment properties like OnCars.com, Hollywoodlife.com, Movieline, and MailTimes in addition to operating the Mail.com portal and email service. In mid-2008, the company received a $35 million growth equity round of financing from a leading private equity fund.

In early 2009, the company announced the purchase of Deadline Hollywood Daily (now known as Deadline.com). The website had previously been operated by publisher, LA Weekly.

In February 2010, MMC finalized and announced a joint venture with Zee TV, one of India's leading TV networks, on the creation of the new India.com web portal and seven other portals. The site was designed to compete with other portals like Indiatimes.com, Yahoo, and Rediff.com. In April 2010, MMC purchased Jonathan Geller's Boy Genius Report (BGR), a tech and gadget blog, for an undisclosed amount of money. MMC moved the blog to a new URL (BGR.com) and also introduced a broader spectrum of technology coverage. Geller remained the website's Editor in Chief after the sale.

In September 2010, the Mail.com Media Corporation announced a transaction in which they would sell the Mail.com email and portal service to Germany-based, United Internet Group, one of the country's leading internet companies. MMC would remain the primary content provider for Mail.com, but the email service itself was operated by United Internet and its GMX email platform.

Variety, Fairchild, and other acquisitions
Sometime in 2012, MMC re-branded itself. In October 2012, PMC purchased Variety Inc. including the weekly Variety magazine, Daily Variety, Variety.com, and all associated assets for a reported $25 million from Reed Elsevier. PMC received financial backing from the hedge fund, Third Point LLC. Some of PMC's early changes to Variety's business plan included eliminating the website's paywall, ceasing the printing of Daily Variety, and investing more in the digital platform, Variety.com. The paywall was taken down on March 1, 2013, and, after being published for 80 years, the last print edition of Daily Variety was issued on March 19, 2013, and a redesigned Variety magazine launched on March 26, 2013.

In late 2014, PMC purchased Fairchild Fashion Media from Condé Nast for just under $100 million. Under the terms of the deal, PMC obtained ownership of Fairchild's print and digital media properties including WWD (Women's Wear Daily), Footwear News, Beauty Inc., and others. Condé Nast had previously in 2003 purchased the assets from Disney Corporation for over $650 million. Two of Fairchild's properties, Style.com and W, remained under Condé Nast's ownership.

In June 2015, Penske Media Corporation formed a partnership with Shutterstock Inc. to compete with Getty Images in the categories of editorial images in the entertainment and fashion industries. Beginning in 2016, Shutterstock had an exclusive right and license to PMC's fashion and entertainment archives. The following month, PMC purchased Gold Derby, a data platform and website that utilizes user and professional predictions to predict the outcome and winners of global awards shows and events. In January 2016, PMC acquired independent film and television platform, Indiewire from SnagFilms, Inc. for an undisclosed amount of money. Michael Schneider the Editor-in-Chief of TV Guide joined Indiewire.com as Executive Editor shortly after the PMC acquisition, joining editorial leaders Anne Thompson, Eric Kohn, and editor Dana Harris.

2017–present; Robb Report, Rolling Stone, and MRC venture
In January 2017, Penske Media Corporation entered into a joint venture for the Robb Report with Rockbridge, the private equity firm of Dan Gilbert. In December 2017, Penske Media acquired a majority stake of Rolling Stone magazine from Wenner Media. In 2018, it expanded further into music with an investment in BuzzAngle Music. Additional acquisitions from 2017 to 2018 include SHE Media, Sourcing Journal, and Art Media Holdings which includes Art in America and ARTnews.

In turn, MRC will form a second joint venture that will develop content tied to PMRC publications.

In February 2022, the company acquired a majority stake in Life Is Beautiful Music & Art Festival, which will be run under Rolling Stone.

In December 2022, PMC acquired the contemporary art magazine Artforum and Bookforum. It was announced on December 12th that PMC would dissolve Bookforum.

Properties

Variety

PMC owns and operates Variety magazine, a trade paper for the entertainment industry founded in 1905, as well as its various digital and data platforms. PMC purchased the publication in 2012 from Reed Elsevier for approximately $30 million.

Rolling Stone

PMC first became the majority owner of Rolling Stone by purchasing a 51 percent stake in the company from Wenner Media in 2017, and then acquired the 49 percent stake held by BandLab Technologies in January 2019 to become its full owner. Rolling Stone is an international media brand which focuses on popular culture, now including magazines published in 15 countries such as China, Australia, India and the United Kingdom. The original American Rolling Stone magazine  was founded in San Francisco in 1967 by magazine publisher Jann Wenner and the music critic Ralph J. Gleason. It was first known for its musical coverage and for political reporting by Hunter S. Thompson. In the 1990s, the magazine shifted focus to a younger readership interested in youth-oriented television shows, film actors and popular AT40-based music. Under PMC, Rolling Stone became a monthly publication in America, but still mixed music coverage with politics and articles on popular culture.

Robb Report

The Robb Report is an American English-language luxury-lifestyle magazine featuring various products, including automobiles, aviation, boating, real estate, and watches.

Deadline Hollywood

Deadline, also known as Deadline Hollywood or Deadline.com and previously known as news blog Deadline Hollywood Daily, is an online magazine founded by Nikki Finke in 2006. The blog had initially been operated by publisher LA Weekly prior to being purchased by Penske Media in June 2009.

Fairchild Fashion Media

Fairchild Fashion Media is a digital media, publishing, and events company that owns multiple fashion-related content properties. PMC purchased Fairchild properties from Condé Nast in late 2014. These publications included WWD (Women's Wear Daily), Footwear News, Beauty Inc., M, and Fairchild Summits. WWD is often considered the "Bible of the fashion industry." The other properties are considered leading business-to-business publications offering news and insights into various fashion and beauty niches.

HollywoodLife.com

Hollywoodlife.com is an entertainment, celebrity, and fashion news website founded and run by former US Weekly, Marie Claire, and Glamour editor, Bonnie Fuller. The site targets women ages 18 to 35 and attracts an audience of 35 million visitors per month.

Sportico
On April 2, 2020, PMC announced that it would launch Sportico—a new vertical focusing on the sports industry. It launched on June 30, 2020, hiring several reporters who previously worked at the sports business division of Bloomberg News.

Bollywood Life

BollywoodLife.com is an entertainment and celebrity news website reporting on Indian popular culture. It is part of Penske Media Corporation, having reportedly attained more than 20 million monthly active users, as well as over 5 million social media followers.

Other properties

Other properties under the PMC banner include the Boy Genius Report (or BGR.com), TVLine, SHE Media, and Sourcing Journal. BGR.com is a tech and gadget blog originally founded by Jonathan Geller and purchased by PMC in 2010. The Gold Derby Awards (or "Gold Derby TV and Film Awards") are awards given by the website Goldderby.com for television and film. The awards began in 2004. Owned by Jay Penske since 2015, it is a brand of the Penske Media Corporation. It has also been an investor in the strategic event management company LDJ Productions since 2020.

References

External links

 

 
Magazine publishing companies of the United States
Companies based in Los Angeles
American companies established in 2004
Privately held companies based in California